Johan Andreas Lippestad (19 December 1902 – 7 November 1961) was a Norwegian minister in the NS government of Vidkun Quisling, from 1941 to 1945. He was responsible for the evacuation of Finnmark in 1944, together with Jonas Lie. In the post-war legal purges in Norway he was convicted of treason and sentenced to life imprisonment with forced labour. He was released from prison in 1956.

References

1902 births
1961 deaths
Government ministers of Norway
Members of Nasjonal Samling
People convicted of treason for Nazi Germany against Norway
Prisoners sentenced to life imprisonment by Norway
Norwegian prisoners sentenced to life imprisonment